Prasco is a comune (municipality) in the Province of Alessandria in the Italian region Piedmont, located about  southeast of Turin and about  south of Alessandria.

Prasco borders the following municipalities: Cremolino, Morbello, Morsasco, and Visone.

References

Cities and towns in Piedmont